Tamarack Development Corporation (Tamarack Homes) is a firm that was started in 1987 and is a subsidiary of Taggart Group of Companies in the Ottawa-Carleton region. In 2005, Tamarack joined Tartan Homes to build Jackson Trails in Stittsville, Ontario, Canada, which was Canada’s first community of Energy Star homes. In 2014 the two builders launched their latest joint project at Poole Creek Village in Ottawa's west end. The Builder launched its first solo condo project in 2014, in Hintonburg, Ontario, Canada. In 2012, Tamarack became a title sponsor of Ottawa Race Weekend in Ottawa, Ontario, Canada.

In February 2003 the company was fined $150,000 after pleading guilty to failures  under the Ontario Occupational Health and Safety Act, where a surveyor was killed by heavy equipment on a construction site in Ottawa.

Current projects
Tamarack currently has 14 completed or ongoing projects, as well as 3 in the pre-construction phase, in the Ottawa-Carleton region.
 Cardinal Creek Village
 Central Condominiums
 Chaperal
 Findlay Creek Village
 Half Moon Bay
 Jackson Trails
 Mondrian Condominiums
 The Meadows
 Poole Creek Village
 Smart House
 Wellington

References

External links
 Tamarack Homes Web Site
 Tarion Builder Registration Details

Real estate companies of Canada
1987 establishments in Canada